Karpe (previously known as Karpe Diem between 2000 and 2018) is a Norwegian rap group from Oslo, consisting of Magdi Omar Ytreeide Abdelmaguid (b. 1984) and Chirag Rashmikant Patel (b. 1984).

Biography 
Magdi Omar Ytreeide Abdelmaguid, of mixed Egyptian/Norwegian origin, was born on 3 June 1984 in Oslo to an Egyptian father and a Norwegian mother from Stryn, Sogn og Fjordane. Chirag Rashmikant Patel, of Indian origin, was born on 20 July 1984 in Lørenskog. His Indian father immigrated from Uganda and Chirag grew up in Oslo. His mother originates from Gujarat, India.

Magdi and Chirag first met in 1998 in the Oslo Handelsgymnasium, where they were both studying and making music individually. The duo was formed in 2000.

The duo has released five albums, four EPs and won a number of awards, including seven Spellemannprisen awards.

Career
Karpe's debut release, Glasskår EP in 2004, was a commercial success and the same-titled single "Glasskår" peaked at #9 on VG-lista, the Norwegian Albums Chart staying for 6 weeks in the chart and becoming certified Gold. Their debut studio album was Rett fra hjertet released in 2006. It reached #10 on VG-lista and sold 18,000 copies. The band got nominated for "Best Album" in Spellemannprisen in 2006 and Karpe won the Norwegian Alarmprisen in 2007. Their 2008 album Fire Vegger was an even bigger success. The album sold more than 30,000 copies and reached #3 in the Norwegian Albums Chart. Aldri solgt en løgn became their third and biggest album topping the Norwegian charts and making them win the prestigious Spellemannprisen award as "Best Hip Hop album" and the single "Ruter" as "Best hit of the year". Other accolades for the album included the official award Bendiksenprisen, Sigval Bergesen d.y.'s honorary "Almennyttige Ærespris" award and international recognition as "Best Norwegian Act" in MTV Europe Music Awards in 2010. They were the recipients of Spellemannprisen 2012 in the category Pop music, for the album Kors på halsen, Ti kniver i hjertet, Mor og Far i døden. In November 2013 Karpe was honored with the P3 award on the radio station P3s first music award show, P3 Gull at Sentrum Scene in Oslo.

In October 2015 they launched a brand new musical project called Heisann Montebello. Nine songs released over two years, each one with their own ambitious music video. For their efforts, they were awarded Spellemannprisen 2016 in the categories Best Urban Act and Album of the Year. They were even nominated in the categories Best Songwriter and Best Music Video for "Den islamske elefanten", directed by Thea Hvistendahl.

They went on touring Norway before they announced that they would play three shows at the Oslo Spektrum Arena in April 2017. All 27,000 tickets were sold in a matter of hours. The three shows turned out to be the core of "The Monkey & The Mouth", a full-length experimental movie directed by The Hvistendahl. It was watched by 52,000 people during its limited four-day theatrical release in December 2017, and revolves around the visual and musical universe created by the band. The music videos for "Heisann Montebello" introduced two characters: The Monkey (Chirag/Entertainment) and the Mouth (Magdi/Art).

The film is a fusion of concert and fiction that together constitutes a "never before seen" hybrid of music video/live-concert/fiction film. "The Monkey and The Mouth" was awarded Amandaprisen 2018 and Kanonprisen at the Norwegian Kosmorama Film Festival in the Production Design category. It was also part of the official selection at the Tallinn Film Festival 2018, CPH PIX Film Festival, Göteborg Film Festival 2018 and it is appointed critics choice at Tromsø International Film Festival 2019.

In 2019 they released the EP SAS PLUS / SAS PUSSY. The EP was released as one 29 minutes and 47 seconds long track. They were rewarded Spellemannprisen 2019 in the category Album of the year for their efforts. In addition to this, they were nominated in the categories Urban and Songwriter of the year. In December 2019 they made two huge and very different announcements. They announced ten shows in Oslo Spektrum Arena in August 2021 (postponed to 2022 due to the Covid-19 pandemic), and at the same time they invited 100 lucky fans to an experience called SAS Skien. SAS Skien took place in Festiviteten in the town of Skien, Norway – an historical building with a total of 114 rooms, that Karpe bought in 2018.

Everyone that bought a ticket to one of the concerts in Oslo Spektrum, could apply to be part of a one of a kind experience in the mysterious house. In October 2020 a total of 100 fans were invited into Festiviteten in Skien – 20 people each night, for five nights. The details surrounding the experience was so secret that not even Karpe’s own friends and family got to be a part of it. Media was not allowed and all the guests had to leave their cellphones at the door.

August 17, 2020 Karpe established the “Patel & Abdelmaguid Foundation”(PAF)[9]. In doing so they gave away their master rights and revenue from all of their previous releases, six studio albums and various EPs and singles, to causes relating to assistance for refugees, asylum seekers and/or immigrants. There are no specific requirements set for the size or catchment area of the projects that receive funds. Both worldwide projects and small local projects are eligible, as long as its work is carried out in accordance with the Fund’s overarching objectives. There will be one allocation in October of each year, with the first allocation in October 2021.

January 2022, they released the film loop Omar Sheriff at https://omarsheriff.no/, and with it presented their new EP.

In August 2022, Karpe sold out Oslo Spektrum 10 times, with a total of 110,000 people. The show reached Variety, which compared the duo to Kanye West and The Weeknd.

Honors 
2008: Spellemannprisen in the category "Hip hop", for the album Fire Vegger
2010: Spellemannprisen in the category "This years spellemann"
2012: Spellemannprisen in the category "Pop music", for the album Kors på halsen, Ti kniver i hjertet, Mor og Far i døden
2013: P3 Gull in the category "P3 Prize"
2015: Spellemannprisen in the category "Best music video" for the single "Hvite menn som pusher 50"
2016: P3 Gull in the category "Live Artist of the Year"
2016: P3 Gull in the category "Song of the Year", for the single "Lett å være rebell i kjellerleiligheten din"
2016: Spellemannprisen in the category "Urban", for the album Heisann Montebello
2016: Spellemannprisen in the category "Album of the Year", for the album Heisann Montebello
2017: P3 Gull in the category "Live Artist of the Year"
2017: Edvardprisen in the category "Text" for Heisann Montebello
2019: P3 Gull in the category "Live Artist of the Year"
2019: Spellemannprisen in the category "Album of the Year", for the album Sas Plus/Sas Pussy

Discography

Albums

EPs

Singles

Other charted songs

References

External links
Official website

Spellemannprisen winners
Norwegian rappers
Norwegian musical duos
Hip hop duos
Musical groups from Oslo
Norwegian hip hop groups